Trifurcula trilobella is a moth of the family Nepticulidae. It is found in mainland Greece as well as the Greek islands.

The wingspan is 5-5.5 mm.

The larvae feed on Salvia triloba. They mine the leaves of their host plant. The mine consists of a very slender, tortuous corridor, hardly widening in the end. It is not particularly associated with the leaf margin or venation. The frass is deposited in an irregularly interrupted black central line that occupies about one third of the width of the corridor. Pupation takes place outside of the mine.

External links
Beitrag zur Kenntnis der Nepticulidenfauna von Anatolien und der Insel Rhodos (Lepidoptera, Nepticulidae)
bladmineerders.nl

Nepticulidae
Moths of Europe
Moths described in 1978